Hexagon Theatre may refer to:

Hexagon Theatre (KwaZulu-Natal), theatre in South Africa
The Hexagon, theatre in Reading, England